CCAP may refer to

The Center for Clean Air Policy
The Center for College Affordability and Productivity, American research center
Certified Change Agent Program
Checkpoint Charlie Audio Productions, Norwegian record label
Chicago Climate Action Plan
Church of Central Africa, Presbyterian
Converged Cable Access Platform
Crustacean cardioactive peptide